Quek See Ling (born in October 1986 in Johor Bahru, Johor, Malaysia) is a Singaporean poet, writer, Chinese ink painter, independent publisher, editor, instructor of Chinese creative writing.

Education 
After graduating from Foon Yew Primary School 2 and Foon Yew High School in Johor Bahru, Malaysia, she obtained Bachelor of Arts in Chinese (minor in Translation) and Master of Arts degrees in Chinese from Nanyang Technological University. Her research papers on Chinese Linguistics were published in Soochew University and National Taiwan University. She obtained Certificate of Chinese Painting with Grade A (Distinction) of Nanyang Academy of Fine Arts in 2018.

Career 
She had been working as an academic editor and tutor of Division of Chinese in Nanyang Technological University, and she was also an invited instructor of Chinese Creative Writing in secondary school. Her poems were recommended by renowned Taiwanese poet Hung Hung 鸿鸿 as "taking the nutrient of life directly, without any burden" ("没有包袱地从生活中摘取活生生的养分”). Renowned Hong Kong writer Dung Kai-cheung recommended her poems "has Zhuangzi-style and she provides the new definition of the poem world"("有庄子之风，移风易俗，定义诗的新境界"). Her Chinese paintings were recommended by renowned Singaporean artist Chua Poh Leng as "very literate, bold and fearless with a sense of humour and joy, and put her audiences in a smile" ("立意大胆带幽默，笔墨磅礴，甚有文气，看了令人会心一笑”). She was invited as one of the five International Poets (国际诗人) in 2019 Taipei Poetry Festival （2019台北诗歌节）.

Award / Selected Works

Creative Award (Poetry/Painting) 
2016：21 published poems were selected by Taiwan Poetry Magazine《卫生纸》(Toilet Paper, edited by Hung Hung 鸿鸿), issue 31 & 33.
2018：10 poems were selected by Shanghai Literature Magazine《外国文艺》(Foreign Literature, published by Shanghai Yiwen Publishing 上海译文出版社), issue 5 (October).
2019：Poetry “三等老人”（Old People with Three Types of Waiting）, 陈大为、钟怡雯主编《华文文学百年选.马华卷2：小说、新诗》(Chen Da-Wei & Choong Yee Voon eds., Selected Hundred-Year Chinese Literary Works - Malaysian Chinese Issue: Novel & Poetry), Taipei: 九歌出版社 (Chiu-Ko Publishing), 2019, pp.395-396.
2020: Chinese Painting "Distanced But Not Apart (停见不停爱) was selected by the "#SGArtforHCW" Exhibition Project (co-organised by National Gallery Singapore and Singapore Medical Association)

Editor Award 
2017：Booklist of Lianhe Zaobao 2016 (《致读者：新加坡书店故事1881-2016》[Passage of Time: Singapore Bookstore Stories 1881-2016], one of the five contributors and editors) 
2020：Booklist of Lianhe Zaobao 2019 (《马来散记（新编注本）》《狮城散记（新编注本）》[Lu Po-Yeh's Malayan Sketches and Singaporean Sketches (Newly Edited and Annotated), Executive editor, one of the two annotators, and one of the three reviewers) ]

Works

Poetry collections 
Walking Me on Me (《我走在我之上》) (Singapore: Self-Publishing，2014) 
Bulletproof, Yet How Could We Embrace (《穿着防弹衣的我们怎么拥抱》) (Singapore: Self-Publishing, 2015) 
When Your Muse Is Stuck in Traffic (《当你灵感塞车》) (Singapore: Self-Publishing, 2016) 
Gaining While Losing (《得不到你时得到你》) (Written and Illustrated by Quek See Ling) (Singapore: Self-Publishing, 2017) 
Meat Up with You (《肉与肉的相遇》) (Written and Illustrated by Quek See Ling) (Singapore: Self-Publishing, 2019) 
To the Lovely Grey (《致美好的灰色》) (Written and Illustrated by Quek See Ling) (Singapore: Self-Publishing, Mar 2020) 
Promised Not To Stir (《说好不搅拌》) (Written and Illustrated by Quek See Ling) (Singapore: Self-Publishing, Aug 2020)

Co-authored historical books 
《致读者：新加坡书店故事1881-2016》(Singapore: Chou Sing Chu Foundation, 2016) 
Passage of Time: Singapore Bookstore Stories 1881-2016 (Singapore: Chou Sing Chu Foundation, 2016) 
Chou Sing Chu, Founder of POPULAR: Portrait of a Book Industry Titan (Bilingual Book, Chinese Title: 百年书业话星衢：大众书局创办人周星衢纪事) (Singapore: Chou Sing Chu Foundation, 2019)

Painting collection 
 Untamed Heart: Chinese Paintings by Quek See Ling (《野生的心：郭诗玲水墨画集》) (Painted & Edited by Quek See Ling) (Singapore: Self-Publishing, 2018)

Edited book 
《拉长的影子：新加坡与外国作家写作理由32札》（Elongated Shadows: 32 Passages By Writers from Singapore and Beyond on Their Reasons for Writing （Singapore: Self-Publishing, 2021）

Annotated books 
鲁白野著，周星衢基金编注《马来散记（新编注本）》 (Lu Po-Yeh's Malayan Sketches [Newly Edited and Annotated], Executive editor, one of the two annotators, and one of the three reviewers) (Singapore: Chou Sing Chu Foundation, 2019) 
鲁白野著，周星衢基金编注《狮城散记（新编注本）》 (Lu Po-Yeh's Singaporean Sketches [Newly Edited and Annotated], Executive editor, one of the two annotators, and one of the three reviewers) (Singapore: Chou Sing Chu Foundation, 2019)

Children's Storybooks 
(Pen Name: Super Egg Tart )
 I Love to Learn 5 (《我爱学习5》) (Story & Text: Quek See Ling; Illustration: Ren Hua-bin) (Singapore: Chou Sing Chu Foundation, 2019) 
 I Love Legends 5 (《我爱经典5》) (Editor: Quek See Ling; Illustrator: Ikkoku) (Singapore: Chou Sing Chu Foundation, 2019) 
 I Love Life 6 (《我爱生活6》) (Story & Text: Quek See Ling; Illustration: Ikkoku) (Singapore: Chou Sing Chu Foundation, 2021) 
 I Love Legends 6 (《我爱经典6》) (Editor: Quek See Ling; Illustrator: Xiao Bi) (Singapore: Chou Sing Chu Foundation, 2021) 
 Little Curry Puff: The Mysterious Tissue Paper (《辣弟阿角：神秘的纸巾》) (Story & Text: Quek See Ling; Illustrator: Yue Ye Tao) (Singapore: Chou Sing Chu Foundation, 2022)

References

External links 
十〇诗书画印工作室-郭诗玲 Quek See Ling's Blog
十〇诗书画印工作室-郭诗玲 Quek See Ling's Facebook Page
Google Scholar-Quek See Ling 郭诗玲
Behance-Paintings by See Ling Quek
International Poet of 2019 Taipei Poetry Festival - Quek See Ling

Nanyang Technological University alumni
1986 births
Living people